Acrocercops crypsigrapha is a moth of the family Gracillariidae, known from Myanmar. It was described by Edward Meyrick in 1930.

References

crypsigrapha
Moths of Asia
Moths described in 1930